KOPB 1600 AM is a radio station licensed to serve Eugene, Oregon. The station is owned by Oregon Public Broadcasting. It airs a news/talk format. It airs public radio programming primarily from NPR.

The station was assigned the KOPB call letters by the Federal Communications Commission on February 20, 2008.

Ownership
On November 28, 2007, it was reported that Oregon Public Broadcasting reached an agreement to purchase KOPT from Churchill Media for $500,000. On February 20, 2008, the station switched from Air America Radio to OPB programming.

Although KOAC in Corvallis easily covers much of Eugene, some areas in the southern part of the city don't get a strong signal. KOPB serves to fill in those areas.

External links
KOPB official website
Oregon Public Broadcasting
FCC History Cards for KOPB

OPB
News and talk radio stations in the United States
Radio stations established in 1947
Lane County, Oregon
NPR member stations
1947 establishments in Oregon